The 1886 Minnesota gubernatorial election was held on November 2, 1886 to elect the governor of Minnesota.

Results

References

1886
Minnesota
gubernatorial
November 1886 events